Gustav Adolf Fischer (3 March 1848 – 11 November 1886, Berlin) was a German explorer of Africa.

Biography
He was born at Barmen. In 1876 he accompanied Clemens Denhardt's expedition to Zanzibar, where he settled as a physician.

In the following year he explored Wituland and the southern Oromo country. In 1878 he continued his journey to Wapokomoland and along the Tana River to Massa.

With the support of the Geographical Society of Hamburg he visited the Maasai country in 1882 and penetrated from the mouth of the Pangani River to Lake Naivasha. The Maasai prevented him from advancing further. Equipped with funds by the brother of Wilhelm Junker, an explorer, who with Emin Pasha and Gaetano Casati had been lost in the equatorial provinces, he organized a relief expedition which, however, was compelled to return after reaching Lake Victoria.  
Shortly after his return to Germany in 1886 he died of a bilious fever contracted during his journey.

He is commemorated in the names of a number of animals, including Fischer's lovebird, Agapornis fischeri Fischer's starling (Lamprotornis fischeri) and also a number of plants, including Gutenbergia rueppellii var. fischeri and Ligularia fischeri (Fischers ragwort).

Literary works 
 Mehr Licht im dunkeln Weltteil (1885)
 Das Masai-Land (1885)
He also wrote articles for Zeitschrift für Ethnologie and for the Verhandlungen of the Hamburg Geographical Society.

Notes

References

German explorers of Africa
German non-fiction writers
1848 births
1886 deaths
Physicians from Wuppertal
19th-century German physicians
German male non-fiction writers